Grays Harbor National Wildlife Refuge is located within Grays Harbor, at the mouth of the Chehalis River, which makes up the second largest watershed in Washington. It is one of four major staging areas for migrating shorebirds in the Pacific Flyway. Up to one million shorebirds gather here in spring and fall to feed and rest.

Grays Harbor is designated as a Western Hemisphere Shorebird Reserve Network Site, recognizing this internationally significant shorebird habitat. Although the refuge occupies only two percent of the intertidal habitat of Grays Harbor, it hosts up to 50 percent of the shorebirds that stage in the estuary. As many as 24 species of shorebirds use Grays Harbor National Wildlife Refuge, with the most abundant species being western sandpiper and dunlin. Semipalmated plover, least sandpiper, red knot, and black-bellied plover are also common during migration. The refuge is also used by peregrine falcon, bald eagle, northern harrier, Caspian tern, great blue heron, songbirds, and a variety of waterfowl.

The accessible boardwalk offers a means to develop and implement interpretation and education programs for the more than one million travelers that pass by each year on their way through the gateway to the Olympic Peninsula.

References

External links

Grays Harbor National Wildlife Refuge U.S. Fish and Wildlife Service

National Wildlife Refuges in Washington (state)
Protected areas of Grays Harbor County, Washington
Wetlands of Washington (state)
Landforms of Grays Harbor County, Washington
Protected areas established in 1990
1990 establishments in Washington (state)